Crowell is a locality in the Canadian province of Nova Scotia, located in the Municipality of the District of Barrington of Shelburne County.

Originally a community, it was amalgamated with the community of Barrington Passage in 2006.

See also
 List of communities in Nova Scotia

References

External links
Crowell on Destination Nova Scotia

Communities in Shelburne County, Nova Scotia
General Service Areas in Nova Scotia